Jean-René Seurin (20 April 1900 – 27 April 1981) was a French sprinter. He competed in the 200 m event at the 1920 Summer Olympics, but failed to reach the final.

References

1900 births
1981 deaths
French male sprinters
Athletes (track and field) at the 1920 Summer Olympics
Olympic athletes of France
Athletes from Paris